The FIBA Oceania Championship for Men 1975 was the qualifying tournament of FIBA Oceania for the 1976 Summer Olympics. Australia won the series 3-0 to win its second consecutive Oceania Championship.

Teams that did not enter

Results

References
FIBA Archive

FIBA Oceania Championship
Championship
1975 in New Zealand basketball
1975 in Australian basketball
International basketball competitions hosted by Australia
Australia men's national basketball team games
New Zealand men's national basketball team games
Basketball in Tasmania
Basketball in Victoria (Australia)
November 1975 sports events in Oceania